is a railway station in the city of Toyota, Aichi, Japan, operated by Meitetsu.

Lines
Tsuchihashi Station is served by the Meitetsu Mikawa Line and is 11.1 kilometers from the terminus of the line at Chiryū Station.

Station layout
The station  has one side platform and one island platform, connected by an elevated station building. The station has automated ticket machines, Manaca automated turnstiles and is staffed.

Platforms

Adjacent stations

|-
!colspan=5|Nagoya Railroad

Station history
Tsuchihashi Station was opened on July 5, 1920, as a station on the privately owned Mikawa Railway. The Mikawa Railway was merged with Meitetsu on June 1, 1941. All freight operations were discontinued in December 1983. A new station building was completed in 1994, and expanded in 2010.

Passenger statistics
In fiscal 2017, the station was used by an average of 8023 passengers daily.

Surrounding area
 Toyota Motomachi factory

See also
 List of Railway Stations in Japan

References

External links

 Official web page 

Railway stations in Japan opened in 1920
Railway stations in Aichi Prefecture
Stations of Nagoya Railroad
Toyota, Aichi